Sheldry P. Osepa is a politician and lawyer from Curaçao who was the first Minister Plenipotentiary of Curaçao. Before this, Osepa was Commissioner of Constitutional Affairs in the island government of Curaçao. When Curaçao attained country status within the Kingdom of the Netherlands on 10 October 2010, Osepa assumed his office as first Minister Plenipotentiary of Curaçao.

Biography
Osepa graduated in 2002 with an LL.M. degree in Dutch law from Tilburg University in the Netherlands.

References

Dutch civil servants
Living people
Curaçao politicians
Ministers plenipotentiary (Curaçao)
Movement for the Future of Curaçao politicians
Year of birth missing (living people)